Game On is a Canadian teen sitcom, which premiered on YTV in May 2015.

Based on the Norwegian series Kampen, the show stars Grayson Gurnsey as Toby Martin, a 14-year-old boy whose successes and failures in life are narrated in the style of a sports play-by-play by an anchor team played by Jonathan Torrens and Samantha Bee.

Cast

Main
 Grayson Gurnsey as Toby Martin
 Jonathan Torrens as Bob
 Samantha Bee as Geri

Recurring
 Jamie Mayers as Seth Millwood

References

External links

2015 Canadian television series debuts
2016 Canadian television series endings
2010s Canadian sitcoms
2010s Canadian teen sitcoms
English-language television shows
Television shows filmed in Montreal
YTV (Canadian TV channel) original programming
Television series by Corus Entertainment
Television series about teenagers